Khanjapur or Khanjapur is a village situated at the periphery of Gournadi Upazila, Barishal District in the Barishal Division of Bangladesh.

References

Populated places in Barisal District